Niasso is a small town and commune in the Cercle of San in the Ségou Region of Mali. In 1998 the commune had a population of 11,257.

References

Communes of Ségou Region